Parakysis grandis is a species of catfish of the family Akysidae. A detailed discussion of this species's relationship with the other member of its genus can be found at Parakysis.

Akysidae
Fish described in 1995